The Standing Committee on Language Education and Research is a quasi-governmental advisory body set up to carry out research into language education, including public consultation exercises, and to give advice on language education policy including medium of instruction policy to the Hong Kong Government's Education and Manpower Bureau (formerly the Education Department. It is currently chaired by Michael Tien.

External links
 Official Website

Education in Hong Kong
Hong Kong, Language Education and Research